Alexei Kiliakov (born 11 April 2005) is an Israeli-American ice dancer who currently represents Israel. With his skating partner, Elizabeth Tkachenko, he competed in the final segment at the 2022 World Junior Figure Skating Championships.

Personal life 
Kiliakov was born on 11 April 2005, in Gaithersburg, Maryland to parents Alexei, Sr. and Elena, both ice dance coaches originally from Russia. Kiliakov and his skating partner, Elizabeth Tkachenko, have known each other since they were toddlers.

Programs

With Tkachenko

Competitive highlights 
CS: Challenger Series; JGP: Junior Grand Prix

With Tkachenko for Israel

With Tkachenko for the United States

References

External links 
 

2005 births
Living people
American male ice dancers
Israeli male ice dancers
People from Gaithersburg, Maryland